The following is a list of mainland Chinese films first released in 2006. There were 300 Chinese feature films produced of which 74 were screened in China in 2006.

See also 
 2006 in China

References

External links
IMDb list of Chinese films

Chinese
Films
2006